Vanessa Sue DiBernardo (born May 15, 1992) is an American soccer player who plays as a midfielder for Kansas City Current of the National Women's Soccer League (NWSL). She previously played for and captained Chicago Red Stars. Internationally, DiBernardo was a member of the United States U-23 women's national soccer team.

Early life
DiBernardo was raised in Naperville, Illinois, where she attended Waubonsie Valley High School and helped lead the soccer team to state championship wins in 2007, 2008, and 2010.
In 2009, she was named to the ESPN Rise All-American Third Team and earned Beacon News Girls Soccer Player of the Year and Chicago Sun-Times All-Area honors. During her senior year in 2010, she was named Gatorade Illinois Player of the Year, IHSSCA Illinois Player of the Year, and was ranked fifty-first in the country for high school seniors by Top Drawer Soccer.

College career

University of Illinois
As a freshman in 2010, DiBernardo led the Big Ten Conference in goals and points and was named the Big Ten Freshman of the Year. During her sophomore year, she led her team with 17 goals and was named to the MAC Hermann Trophy Watch List. Despite missing a portion of her junior season due to the 2012 U-20 World Cup, DiBernardo still led the Illini in points, goals, and shots. In October 2012, she was named Player of the Week by the Big Ten Conference, Top Drawer Soccer and College Sports Madness after scoring a hat-trick and helping the team defeat the University of Michigan. Unable to play the full season again due to a knee injury which kept her out for seven games, she tallied seven goals in 15 games and had a career high seven assists. DiBernardo finished her Illini career setting the school's record for most career assists and tying the school's record for most career shots. She was named to the Hermann Trophy Watch List for a third time. In 2014, she was awarded the Big Ten Medal of Honor, which recognizes one male and one female student from the graduating class of each Big Ten member school, for demonstrating joint athletic and academic excellence throughout their college career.

Club career

Chicago Red Eleven
In 2008, DiBernardo played for the Chicago Red Eleven in the W-League.

Chicago Red Stars, 2014–2022
DiBernardo was selected as the fourth overall pick in the 2014 NWSL College Draft by the Chicago Red Stars. She previously played for Red Stars' head coach Rory Dames with the Red Stars' WPSL team in 2011 and with the Chicago Eclipse Select in 2012–2013. Of her and Julie Johnston's signing, Coach Dames said, "In Julie and Vanessa, we picked up the best holding midfielder and the best attacking midfielder in the draft. They will form the spine of our team down the middle for years to come. With both of them having the experience of winning the U20 World Cup, they are both proven winners at the highest level."

In her rookie season DiBernardo appeared in 23 out of 24 matches and scored 1 goal and provided 3 assists.

In 2015 DiBernardo played in all 21 matches for the Red Stars, she scored 2 goals and provide 5 assists, and was voted by fans as the team Unsung Hero. The Red Stars finished the season in 2nd place and qualified for the play-offs for the first time. Chicago lost to FC Kansas City 3–0 in the semi-final.

DiBernardo once again played in every match for Chicago in 2016. She provided 7 assists in 2016 which led the team and was the second highest in the league. Chicago once again qualified for the play-offs but lost the semi-final in extra time to the Washington Spirit. DiBernardo was named to the 2016 NWSL Second XI.

In 2017 DiBernardo appeared in 21 games and scored 3 goals. Chicago was eliminated in the semi-finals for the third straight season.

DiBernardo suffered a stress fracture in her hip during the 2018 Thorns Spring Invitational which would sideline her for the first two months of the 2018 NWSL season. She returned to the field on June 17 against the Portland Thorns. DiBernardo appeared in 12 games in 2018 and scored 2 goals.

Loan to Perth Glory
DiBernardo joined Perth Glory of the W-League on loan for the 2015–16 season. She returned to Perth for the 2016–17 season and scored 6 goals in 14 games. Perth advanced to the 2017 Grand Final but lost to Melbourne City 2–0.

International career
DiBernardo has represented the United States at the under-20 and under-23 levels. During the 2012 FIFA U-20 Women's World Cup, she helped the U.S. advance to the semi-finals after scoring the game-opening goal against China. The team defeated China 2–1. The team later defeated Germany 1–0 to clinch the championship.

In August 2013, DiBernardo was called up to the senior national team camp ahead of a friendly match against Mexico on September 3 while still in college. She did not end up playing in the match.

In December 2019, DiBernardo was called up for a training camp with the senior national team.

Personal life
DiBernado's father Angelo DiBernardo competed at 1984 Summer Olympics and other international matches, as a member of the USA men's national soccer team; they are the only father/daughter relationship among soccer players that represented USA.  Her father was born in Argentina of Italian descent, so Vanessa would be eligible to play for either country's national team.

Honors

Club
NWSL Second XI: 2016

International
 CONCACAF U-20 Women's Championship: 2012
 FIFA U-20 Women's World Cup: 2012

See also

 2012 FIFA U-20 Women's World Cup squads

References

External links
 U.S. Soccer player profile
 Chicago Red Stars player profile
 University of Illinois player profile
 

American women's soccer players
1992 births
Living people
American people of Argentine descent
Illinois Fighting Illini women's soccer players
Soccer players from Illinois
Women's association football midfielders
Chicago Red Stars players
Perth Glory FC (A-League Women) players
Sportspeople from Naperville, Illinois
National Women's Soccer League players
A-League Women players
Expatriate women's soccer players in Australia
Chicago Red Stars draft picks
United States women's under-20 international soccer players
Women's Premier Soccer League players
American expatriate women's soccer players
American expatriate sportspeople in Australia
Women's Premier Soccer League Elite players